The  were a set of four emperors (Emperor Go-Daigo and his line) whose claims to sovereignty during the Nanboku-chō period spanning from 1336 through 1392 were usurped by the Northern Court. This period ended with the Southern Court definitively losing the war, and they were forced to completely submit sovereignty to the Northern Court. This had the result that, while later Japanese sovereigns were descended from the Northern Court, posterity assigns sole legitimacy during this period to the Southern Court.

Nanboku-chō overview

The genesis of the Northern Court go back to Emperor Go-Saga, who reigned from 1242 through 1246.  Go-Saga was succeeded by two of his sons, Emperor Go-Fukakusa and Emperor Kameyama, who took turns on the throne.  This was because on his death bed in 1272, Go-Saga had insisted that his sons adopt a plan in which future emperors from the two fraternal lines would ascend the throne in alternating succession.  This plan proved to be unworkable, resulting in rival factions and rival claimants to the throne.

Northern Court
In 1333, when the Southern Emperor Go-Daigo staged the Kenmu Restoration and revolted against the Kamakura shogunate, the shōgun responded by declaring Emperor Kōgon, Go-Daigo's second cousin once removed and the son of an earlier emperor, Emperor Go-Fushimi of the Jimyōin-tō, as the new emperor. After the destruction of the Kamakura shogunate in 1333, Kōgon lost his claim, but his brother, Emperor Kōmyō, and two of his sons were supported by the new Ashikaga shōguns as the rightful claimants to the throne. Kōgon's family thus formed an alternate Imperial Court in Kyoto, which came to be called the Northern Court because its seat was in a location north of its rival.

During the Meiji period, an Imperial decree dated April 3, 1911 established that the legitimate reigning monarchs of this period were the direct descendants of Emperor Go-Daigo through Emperor Go-Murakami, whose Southern Court had been established in exile in Yoshino, near Nara.

The Northern Court established in Kyoto by Ashikaga Takauji is therefore considered illegitimate.

Northern Pretenders
These are the Hokuchō or Northern Court emperors:
Emperor Kōgon 1332–1333.
 –
Emperor Kōmyō 1336–1348.
Emperor Sukō 1348–1351.
–
Emperor Go-Kōgon 1352–1371.
Emperor Go-En'yū 1371–1382.
Emperor Go-Komatsu 1382–1392 (then went on to reign as legitimate emperor 1392–1412)

The Imperial Court supported by the Ashikaga shōguns was rivaled by the Southern Court of Go-Daigo and his descendants. This came to be called the Southern Court because its seat was in a location south of its rival.  Although the precise location of the emperors' seat did change, it was often identified as simply Yoshino.

In 1392, Emperor Go-Kameyama of the Southern Court was defeated and abdicated in favor of Kōgon's great-grandson, Emperor Go-Komatsu, thus ending the divide. But the Northern Court was under the power of the Ashikaga shōguns and had little real independence. Partly because of this, since the 19th century, the Emperors of the Southern Imperial Court have been considered the legitimate Emperors of Japan. Moreover, the Southern Court controlled the Japanese imperial regalia. The Northern Court members are officially called pretenders.

One Southern Court descendant, Kumazawa Hiromichi, declared himself to be Japan's rightful Emperor in the days after the end of the Pacific War in World War II.  He claimed that Emperor Hirohito was a fraud, arguing that Hirohito's entire line is descended from the Northern Court.  Despite this, he was not arrested for lèse-majesté, even when donning the Imperial Crest. He could and did produce a koseki detailing his bloodline back to Go-Daigo in Yoshino, but his claims and rhetoric failed to inspire anything other than sympathy.

Southern Court emperors
These are the Nanchō or Southern Court emperors:
Emperor Go-Daigo 1336–1339.
Emperor Go-Murakami 1339–1368.
Emperor Chōkei 1368–1383.
Emperor Go-Kameyama 1383–1392.

Re-unification Agreement
Go-Kameyama reached an agreement with Go-Komatsu to return to the old alternations on a ten-year plan.  However, Go-Komatsu broke this promise, not only ruling for 20 years, but being succeeded by his own son, rather than by one from the former Southern Court.

Notes

References 

 Dower, John W. (1999). Embracing Defeat: Japan in the Wake of World War II. New York: W. W. Norton. ; 
 Mehl, Margaret. (1997). History and the State in Nineteenth-Century Japan. New York: St Martin's Press. ; OCLC 419870136
 Ponsonby-Fane, Richard Arthur Brabazon. (1959).  The Imperial House of Japan. Kyoto: Ponsonby Memorial Society. OCLC 194887
 Thomas, Julia Adeney. (2001). Reconfiguring Modernity: Concepts of Nature in Japanese Political Ideology. Berkeley: University of California Press. ; 
  Titsingh, Isaac, ed. (1834).  Nipon o daï itsi ran; ou,  Annales des empereurs du Japon. (written by Hayashi Gahō in 1652).  Paris: Oriental Translation Fund of Great Britain and Ireland. 
 Varley, H. Paul, ed. (1980). A Chronicle of Gods and Sovereigns: Jinnō Shōtōki (translated from the 1359 Kitabatake Chikafusa work).  New York: Columbia University Press. ; OCLC 311157159

Japanese nobility
Former countries in Japanese history